Perissodonta is a genus of sea snails, marine gastropod mollusks in the family Struthiolariidae, the ostrich-foot snails.

Species
Species within the genus Perissodonta include:
 Perissodonta georgiana Strebel, 1908
 Perissodonta mirabilis (Smith, 1875)

References

Struthiolariidae